, an affiliated university of Senshu University, is a private university in Ishinomaki, Miyagi, Japan, established in 1989. The predecessor Senshu University was founded in 1880.

External links
 Official website 

Educational institutions established in 1989
Private universities and colleges in Japan
Universities and colleges in Miyagi Prefecture
1989 establishments in Japan
Ishinomaki